San Matías Airport ,  is an airport serving the town of San Matías in the Santa Cruz Department of Bolivia.

The San Matias non-directional beacon(Ident: SMT) is located at the north end of the field.

See also

Transport in Bolivia
List of airports in Bolivia

References

External links 
OpenStreetMap - San Matías
OurAirports - San Matías
SkyVector - San Matías
Fallingrain - San Matías Airport

Airports in Santa Cruz Department (Bolivia)